Quadratus is Latin for square and quadratus muscle may refer to:

 Depressor labii inferioris muscle, also known as musculus quadratus labii inferioris
 Levator labii superioris muscle, also known as musculus quadratus labii superioris
 Pronator quadratus, a square shaped muscle on the distal forearm that acts to pronate (turn so the palm faces downwards) the hand
 Quadratus femoris muscle, a flat, quadrilateral skeletal muscle. Located on the posterior side of the hip joint
 Quadratus lumborum muscle, a muscle of the posterior abdominal wall
 Quadratus plantae muscle, a muscle in the foot